Shoulda Known Better may refer to:

 A song by Janet Jackson from the 2015 album Unbreakable
 A 2019 single by MKTO
 A song by Unwritten Law from the 2007 album The Hit List
 A 2014 song by Honey Mahogany

See also
 I Should Have Known Better (disambiguation)
 Should've Known Better (disambiguation)